is a Japanese anime television series loosely adapted from the original manga series of the same name by Hiromu Arakawa. Comprising 51 episodes, it was produced by the animation studio Bones for Mainichi Broadcasting System and Aniplex, and directed by Seiji Mizushima. It was broadcast on MBS in Japan from October 2003 to October 2004.

As in the manga, the series follows the adventures of brothers Edward and Alphonse Elric, who are searching for the Philosopher's Stone so they can regain the bodies they lost in a failed attempt to bring their dead mother back to life. During production, Arakawa requested an original ending for the anime that differed from the manga, which was still ongoing at the time. This led to the series deviating into an entirely original storyline direction halfway through its run. The first anime series concluded with a direct sequel film, Conqueror of Shamballa, released in 2005. A second anime series, Fullmetal Alchemist: Brotherhood, which faithfully adapted the entire storyline of the original manga, was broadcast in 2009.

Plot

The first half of the anime's plot adapts the first seven volumes of the manga. However, the plots severely diverge from each other by the middle of the story, specifically around the time where Roy Mustang's friend Maes Hughes is murdered by the homunculus Envy in disguise. Dante, a former lover of Hohenheim  and mentor to the Elric brothers' teacher, is the series' central antagonist. Centuries ago, Hohenheim and Dante perfected methods for making the Philosopher's Stone and achieved immortality by transferring their souls and intellects into other bodies as they age. Hohenheim was eventually overcome with the guilt of sacrificing lives to make the Stone and left Dante. Although Dante can still jump from body to body with the last stone she and Hohenheim created, she is not willing to risk the rebound of creating one herself. She thus uses the homunculi to encourage Edward and Alphonse, along with other equally desperate Alchemists to create another complete Philosopher's Stone for her.

When Scar creates the Philosopher's Stone, at the cost of his life as well as the lives of 7,000 soldiers, he infuses it into Alphonse's metal body, which leads to Alphonse's kidnapping. Edward tries to rescue him, but is killed by Envy. However, Alphonse uses the Philosopher's Stone to revive his brother but disappears in the process, along with Envy, who fails to stop him. Dante tries to escape, but she is killed when the homunculus Gluttony, whose mind she had earlier destroyed, fails to recognize his master. After being revived, Edward risks his life to bring back his brother and finds himself in Munich, while Alphonse recovers his original body. Determined to reunite with Alphonse, Edward becomes involved in rocketry research, intending to use that technology to return to his home world. The story concludes in the film adaptation Conqueror of Shamballa, in which Edward's search attracts the attention of the Thule Society, which seeks to enter his homeworldbelieving it to be Shamballato obtain new weapons to help them in World War II. Dietlinde Eckhart, a member of the Thule Society, enters the other world and tries to destroy Amestris. She is defeated by the Elric brothers, who decide to stay in Germany.

Production
During the development of the Fullmetal Alchemist anime, Arakawa allowed Bones to work independently from her, and requested they produce an original ending different from that of the then ongoing manga. She did not want to repeat the same ending in both media, and wanted to continue writing the manga to develop the characters at her own pace. When watching the anime's ending, Arakawa stated that she was amazed about how different the homunculi creatures were from her manga and enjoyed how the staff speculated about the origins of the villains. Although she was not fully involved in all aspects of the 2003 series, she was directly involved in the production of it at a storywise standpoint, and as shown in the extras of Volume 8 of the manga. She helped the anime's development team with consultation for the characters and telling the overall story she had planned for her manga, helping them fill in some of the gaps to create the anime original ending of the 2003 series. Because Arakawa was involved in the development of the anime, she was kept from focusing on the manga's cover illustrations and had little time to illustrate them.

Broadcast and release

The animation studio Bones adapted the manga into a 51-episode anime series. It was directed by Seiji Mizushima, written by Shō Aikawa and co-produced by Bones, Mainichi Broadcasting System and Aniplex. Character designs by Yoshiyuki Itō. The anime premiered on MBS, TBS, and Animax in Japan from October 4, 2003; it ran until October 2, 2004, with a 6.8 percent television viewership rating. During the making of the anime, Arakawa was present in meetings to advise the staff about the world of Fullmetal Alchemist, though she did not write for the television series. The series has been released as thirteen DVDs from December 17, 2003, to January 26, 2005, in Japan by Aniplex. During January 2009, Bones released a "DVD box archives" of the anime. It includes the first anime of fifty-one episodes, the film, the CD soundtracks, and guidebooks from the series.

The English dubbed version of the anime was produced by Funimation and debuted on Adult Swim in the United States on November 6, 2004. Canada's YTV began airing it on March 3, 2006. In the United Kingdom, the anime was broadcast by Rapture TV and AnimeCentral. Animax Asia broadcast the series in the Philippines, India, and South Asia.

Funimation Entertainment released the series as DVD volumes between February 8, 2005, to September 12, 2006. Funimation later re-released the series into two DVD volumes in 2009 and again in 2010. In the United Kingdom, MVM Films distributed the first eight volumes of the series; however, Funimation gave the rights over to Revelation Films. Anime Limited now holds the rights in the UK, and they have released the series in both an ultimate and regular collector's edition Blu-Ray. There were plans for a UK DVD release, but these have been put on-hold as of June 2017. In Australia and New Zealand, Madman Entertainment originally released the series on 13 volumes, before re-releasing the series in two DVD volume collections, and later on Blu-ray in a boxset.

A series of five original video animations (OVAs) were also released. Most of these are side stories and do not expand on the plot. In March 2006, a DVD featuring these OVAs was released in Japan as Fullmetal Alchemist: Premium Collection. Funimation acquired and dubbed the "Premium Collection" in late 2008 for English release. The DVD was released in English on August 4, 2009.

Film
A film sequel to the 2003 series, Fullmetal Alchemist the Movie: Conqueror of Shamballa, was produced by Bones and premiered in Japanese theaters on July 23, 2005. The film follows Edward Elric's attempts to return to his homeworld, having lived for two years in our worldwhich exists in a universe parallel to his ownwhile Alphonse is equally determined to reunite with his brother. Funimation released the English DVD on September 12, 2006.

Music and soundtracks
The music for Fullmetal Alchemist was composed and arranged by Michiru Ōshima and recorded on Mosfilm studio. TV Animation Fullmetal Alchemist Original Soundtrack 1 was released on March 24, 2004, in Japan; the CD has thirty-three tracks, including several background sounds and the first opening and ending theme songs. Although never released officially, a version of the Russian track "Brothers" (Russian: Братья, Bratja; Japanese: Burācha) from this CD has been recorded in English by Vic Mignognawho played Edward Elric in the English dubbed version. TV Animation Fullmetal Alchemist Original Soundtrack 2 was released on December 15, 2004, and contains thirty tracks. TV Animation Fullmetal Alchemist Original Soundtrack 3, released on May 18, 2005, contains twenty-seven tracks.

Fullmetal Alchemist: Complete Best and Fullmetal Alchemist Hagaren Song File (Best Compilation) are compilations of the soundtracks that were released in Japan on October 14, 2004, and December 21, 2005, respectively. A bonus DVD, exclusive to the US release, contains a music video for Nana Kitade's "Indelible Sin". Fullmetal Alchemist The Movie Conqueror Of Shamballa OST, which contains forty-six tracksall of which were used in the featured film Fullmetal Alchemist the Movie: Conqueror of Shamballawas released on July 20, 2005. During December 2004, a concert titled "Tales of Another Festival" was staged in Tokyo and Osaka. It featured performances by several musical artists from the television series and narrations by the voice actors. A DVD of the concert titled Fullmetal Alchemist FestivalTales of Another was released in Japan on April 27, 2005.

Other
Three artbooks titled  were released in Japan; only the first was released by Viz Media. An artbook from the second anime titled Fullmetal Alchemist Official Drawing Collection was also released in November 2010.

A series of five fanbooks titled , each containing information about the anime and several interviews with the staff of the series. Additionally, a series of four guidebooks about the second anime series was released between August 2009 and August 2010. An anime character guide book called  was released in Japan and in the United States.

Reception
The first Fullmetal Alchemist anime premiered in Japan with a 6.82 percent television viewership rating. In 2005, Japanese television network TV Asahi conducted a "Top 100" online web poll and nationwide survey; Fullmetal Alchemist placed first in the online poll and twentieth in the survey. In 2006, TV Asahi conducted another online poll for the top one hundred anime, and Fullmetal Alchemist placed first again.

The first Fullmetal Alchemist won in several categories in the American Anime Awards, including "Long Series", "Best Cast", "Best DVD Package Design", "Best Anime Theme Song" ("Rewrite," by Asian Kung-Fu Generation), and "Best Actor" (Vic Mignognawho played Edward Elric in the English version). It was also nominated in the category of "Best Anime Feature" for Fullmetal Alchemist the Movie: Conqueror of Shamballa. The series also won most of the twenty-sixth Annual Animage Readers' Polls. The series was the winner in the "Favorite Anime Series", "Favorite Episode" (episode seven), "Favorite Male Character" (Edward Elric), "Favorite Female Character" (Riza Hawkeye), "Favorite Theme Song" ("Melissa", by Porno Graffitti), and "Favorite Voice Actor" (Romi Parkwho played Edward in the Japanese version). At the fifth Tokyo Anime Awards, the series won in the categories "Animation Of The Year" (Fullmetal Alchemist: The Conqueror of Shambala), "Best Original Story" (Hiromu Arakawa) and "Best Music" (Michiru Ōshima). In the About.com 2006 American Awards, Fullmetal Alchemist won in the categories "Best New Anime Series" and "Best Animation".

IGN named the first anime the ninety-fifth-best animated series. They said that although it is mostly upbeat with amazing action scenes, it also touches upon the human condition. They described it as "more than a mere anime" and "a powerful weekly drama". The IGN staff featured it in their "10 Cartoon Adaptations We'd Like to See" feature, with comments focused on the characterization in the series. The character designs have been praised; critics said they are different from each other. Samuel Arbogast of Theanime.org said the flashback sequences were annoying. Lori Lancaster of Mania Entertainment called the plot wonderful, and said it is "[a] bit of a tragic coming of age story mixed in with the Odyssey". She wrote, "There is enough action, drama and comedy mixed in to keep most viewers interested. This is one of those anime series that is likely to become a classic."

The series has also received some negative reviews, with Maria Lin of animefringe.com saying that the show's themes "are held hostage by… excessive sentimentality". She criticized the ending, saying that "no character has changed from how they were in the beginning. There have been no revelations. Even as the show tries to show that the Elric brothers are coming into their own as they pursue the stone, they're really not, because they keep on making the same mistakes over and over again without… fundamental change in their ideals. The adage of the soldier and his acceptance of losing his leg is lost on them."

Reviewers praised the soundtrack of the first anime for its variety of musical styles and artists, and the pleasant but not too distracting background music. DVDvisionjapan said the first opening theme and the first ending theme are the best tracks of the series.

Notes

References

External links
 Official Aniplex Fullmetal Alchemist website 
 Official Anime Central Fullmetal Alchemist anime website
 Official Madman Entertainment Fullmetal Alchemist website 
 

Fullmetal Alchemist
2003 anime television series debuts
Adventure anime and manga
Animated television series about brothers
Anime series based on manga
Aniplex
Bones (studio)
Dark fantasy anime and manga
Fiction about alchemy
Films with screenplays by Shō Aikawa
Funimation
Genocide in fiction
Madman Entertainment anime
Mainichi Broadcasting System original programming
Military anime and manga
Odex
Prosthetics in fiction
Anime and manga about revenge
Seven deadly sins in popular culture
Steampunk anime and manga
TBS Television (Japan) original programming